Pyalong  is a town in central Victoria, Australia. The town is located on the Northern Highway, in the Shire of Mitchell local government area,  from the state capital, Melbourne. In 2016 the population had reached 660.

The traditional owners of Pyalong are the Taungurung people, a part of the Kulin nation that inhabited a large portion of central Victoria including Port Phillip Bay and its surrounds.

The first Europeans to settle in the area were Captain George Brunswick Smyth and Lieutenant Alfred Miller Mundy who were operating the Pyalong station by August 1838, and William Hamilton who occupied the adjacent Glenaroua run at the same time. They were followed by Alexander Mollison who initially took up the Coliban station in December 1838 then added the Pyalong station lease in 1839. The town itself was surveyed and proclaimed in 1854, and was sufficiently populated for the Post Office to open on 1 November 1858.

Pyalong was connected by railway in 1890. The line was closed in 1968.

Golfers play at the course of the Pyalong Golf Club on the Northern Highway.

References

External links

Towns in Victoria (Australia)
Shire of Mitchell